Daniel Robbins Sylvester (December 22, 1825 – May 27, 1909) was a member of the Wisconsin State Assembly.

Biography
Sylvester was born on December 22, 1825 in Avon, Maine. He settled in Castle Rock, Wisconsin in 1852. Earlier that year, Sylvester married Clara Winship. They had nine children. During the American Civil War, Sylvester was a captain with the 12th Wisconsin Volunteer Infantry Regiment of the Union Army. Conflicts he took part in include the Siege of Vicksburg and the Atlanta Campaign. He died in 1909.

Political career
Sylvester was a member of the Assembly during the 1877 session. Additionally, he was Chairman of the Town Board (similar to city council) and Assessor of Castle Rock. He was a Republican.

References

External links
Ancestry.co.uk

People from Franklin County, Maine
People from Grant County, Wisconsin
Republican Party members of the Wisconsin State Assembly
Mayors of places in Wisconsin
Wisconsin city council members
People of Wisconsin in the American Civil War
Union Army officers
1825 births
1909 deaths
19th-century American politicians